Boşçalılar (also, Boshchalylar, Boshalar, Boşçallar, and Boshchallar) is a village and municipality in the Imishli District of Azerbaijan. It has a population of 1,583.

References 

Populated places in Imishli District